This is a list of mayors of Leipzig since 1778. Since 1877, their title is Oberbürgermeister, rather than Bürgermeister.

1778–1801: Carl Wilhelm Müller
1794–1813?: Christian Gottfried Hermann
1814–1830: Ludwig Ferdinand Weber
1831: Johann Carl Groß
1831: Dr. Carl Friedrich Schaarschmidt
1831–1839: Dr. Christian Adolph Deutrich
1840–1849: Dr. Johann Karl Groß
1848–1849: Hermann Adolph Klinger
1849–1876: Dr. Carl Wilhelm Otto Koch
1876–1899: Dr. jur. Dr. med. h.c. Otto Robert Georgi, since 1877 Oberbürgermeister
1899–1908: Dr. jur. et. phil. Carl Bruno Troendlin
1908–1917: Dr. Rudolf Bernhard August Dittrich
1918–1930: Dr. Karl Wilhelm August Rothe
1930–1937: Dr. Carl Friedrich Goerdeler
1937: Rudolf Haake
1937–1938: 
1939–1945: Bruno Erich Alfred Freyberg
1945: Wilhelm Johannes Vierling
1945–1949: Richard Moritz Erich Zeigner
1949–1951: Max Ernst Opitz
1951–1959: Hans Erich Uhlich
1959–1970: Walter Kresse
1970–1986: Karl-Heinz Müller  
1986–1989: Bernd Seidel
1989–1990: Günter Hädrich
1990–1998: Dr. Hinrich Lehmann-Grube
1998–2005: Wolfgang Tiefensee (SPD)
2005–2006: Andreas Müller (interim) (SPD)
2006–: Burkhard Jung (SPD)

See also
 Timeline of Leipzig

 
Leipzig
Saxony-related lists